Brad Thorson is a former National Football League (NFL) player and college football player.

Early life
Brad played college football at both Wisconsin and Kansas. Brad played for the Arizona Cardinals in 2011.

References

Arizona Cardinals players
Living people
Place of birth missing (living people)
American LGBT sportspeople
Wisconsin Badgers football players
Kansas Jayhawks football players
LGBT players of American football
1987 births